Jan Van Den Broeck (born March 11, 1989 in Dendermonde) is a Belgian middle distance runner competing primarily in the 800 metres. He finished fifth at the 2012 World Indoor Championships.

His personal bests in the event are 1:46.16 outdoors (Heusden-Zolder 2014) and 1:47.19 indoors (Ghent 2012).

Achievements

References

1989 births
Living people
Belgian male middle-distance runners
People from Dendermonde
Sportspeople from East Flanders